Six Gun Gospel is a 1943 American Western film directed by Lambert Hillyer and written by Adele Buffington and Ed Earl Repp. This is the third film in the "Marshal Nevada Jack McKenzie" series, and stars Johnny Mack Brown as Jack McKenzie and Raymond Hatton as his sidekick Sandy Hopkins, with Inna Gest, Eddie Dew, Kenneth MacDonald and Edmund Cobb. The film was released on August 3, 1943, by Monogram Pictures.

Plot

Cast              
Johnny Mack Brown as Nevada Jack McKenzie
Raymond Hatton as Sandy Hopkins
Inna Gest as Jane Simms
Eddie Dew as Dan Baxter
Kenneth MacDonald as Ace Benton
Edmund Cobb as Waco 
Roy Barcroft as Durkin 
Bud Osborne as Joe 
Isabel Withers as Elvira
Mary MacLaren as Mrs. Mary Dailey
Jack Daley as Ben Dailey
Artie Ortego as Ed 
Lynton Brent as Steve
Milburn Morante as Zeke 
Kernan Cripps as Bill Simms
Tom London as Murdered Gambler

References

External links

1943 films
American Western (genre) films
1943 Western (genre) films
Monogram Pictures films
Films directed by Lambert Hillyer
American black-and-white films
1940s English-language films
1940s American films